The 2006 Hastings Direct International Championships was a women's tennis tournament played on grass courts at the Eastbourne Tennis Centre in Eastbourne in the United Kingdom that was part of Tier II of the 2006 WTA Tour. It was the 32nd edition of the tournament and was held from June 19 through June 24, 2006. Justine Henin-Hardenne won the singles.

Finals

Singles

 Justine Henin-Hardenne defeated  Anastasia Myskina 4–6, 6–1, 7–6(7–5)
 It was Henin-Hardenne's 4th title of the year and the 29th of her career.

Doubles

 Svetlana Kuznetsova /  Amélie Mauresmo defeated  Liezel Huber /  Martina Navratilova 6–2, 6–4
 It was Kuznetsova's only doubles title of the year and the 13th of her career. It was Mauresmo's only doubles title of the year and the 2nd of her career.

References

External links 
 ITF Tournament Profile

Hastings Direct International Championships
Eastbourne International
2006 in English women's sport
June 2006 sports events in the United Kingdom
2006 in English tennis